Tobleronius is a genus of braconid wasps in the family Braconidae. There is at least one described species in Tobleronius, T. orientalis, found in Thailand and Vietnam.

References

Microgastrinae
Insects described in 2018